The UK Rock & Metal Singles Chart is a record chart which ranks the best-selling rock and heavy metal songs in the United Kingdom. Compiled and published by the Official Charts Company, the data is based on each track's weekly physical sales, digital downloads and streams. In 1998, there were 12 singles that topped the 52 published charts. The first number-one single of the year was "The Memory Remains" by American heavy metal band Metallica, which spent the first four weeks of the year at number one. The final number one of the year was Resurrection, an extended play by American industrial metal band Fear Factory.

The most successful song on the UK Rock & Metal Singles Chart in 1998 was "The Unforgiven II" by Metallica, which spent a total of ten weeks at number one during the year. The band also spent five weeks at number one with "The Memory Remains". "Lonely, Cryin', Only" by Therapy? and "Pressure On" by Roger Taylor spent six weeks each at number one; Sonic Youth's "Sunday" spent five weeks at number one; Marilyn Manson's Remix & Repent and Whale's "Crying at Airports" were both number one for four weeks; "November Rain" by Guns N' Roses and "Choke" by Sepultura spent three weeks each at number one; and "Mungo City" by Spacehog, "Wishlist" by Pearl Jam and Resurrection by Fear Factory spent two weeks each at number one on the UK Rock & Metal Singles Chart during 1998.

Chart history

See also
1998 in British music
List of UK Rock & Metal Albums Chart number ones of 1998

References

External links
Official UK Rock & Metal Singles Chart Top 40 at the Official Charts Company
The Official UK Top 40 Rock Singles at BBC Radio 1

1998 in British music
United Kingdom Rock and Metal Singles
1998